Chrysina resplendens is a scarab beetle found in Costa Rica, Panama, El Salvador and other countries in Central America.

References

Further reading

External links
Generic Guide to New World Scarab Beetles - Chrysina resplendens (Boucard)

Rutelinae
Beetles of Central America
Beetles described in 1875
Taxa named by Adolphe Boucard